Pseudoeurycea orchileucos, commonly known as the Sierra de Juárez worm salamander, is a species of salamander in the family Plethodontidae.

Description
Males measure  in snout–vent length. The head is about as wide as the body; the eyes are protuberant. There are 13 costal grooves. The specific name orchileucos, from the Greek orchis (=testicle) and leukos (=white), refers to the white color of the outer epithelial layer of the testes and vasa deferentia in adult males (the latter might have scattered melanocytes). This trait distinguishes it from Pseudoeurycea orchimelas with black testes and vasa deferentia.

Habitat and conservation
Natural habitats of Pseudoeurycea orchileucos are cloud forests. They live in leaf litter terrestrially and fossorially; most specimens have been recovered by turning rocks and stones or in and under rotting logs. The species is threatened by habitat loss (deforestation) caused by expanding subsistence farming and human settlements and by logging. It is a rare, poorly known species.

References

orchileucos
Amphibians described in 2002
Fauna of the Sierra Madre de Oaxaca
Endemic amphibians of Mexico
Taxonomy articles created by Polbot